Üçtepe (literally "three hills"), also spelled Üçtəpə or Uchtepe or Uchepe or Uch Tappeh or Ooch Tappeh or Owch Tappeh, is a Turkic place name and may refer to the following places:

Turkey
 Üçtepe, Bismil
 Üçtepe, Erdemli, Mersin Province 
 Üçtepe, İmamoğlu, Adana Province

Azerbaijan

 Üçtəpə, Baku
 Üçtəpə, Goygol
 Üçtəpə, Jalilabad

Iran

 Uch Tappeh, East Azerbaijan
 Uch Tappeh, Golestan
 Uch Tappeh, Kabudarahang, Hamadan Province
 Uch Tappeh, Malayer, Hamadan Province
 Uch Tappeh, Markazi
 Uch Tappeh, West Azerbaijan
 Uch Tappeh-ye Kord, West Azerbaijan Province
 Uch Tappeh-ye Qaleh, West Azerbaijan Province
 Owch Tappeh, Zanjan
Owch Tappeh-ye Gharbi Rural District, in East Azerbaijan Province
Owch Tappeh-ye Sharqi Rural District, in East Azerbaijan Province